Farah Mohamed Jama Awl (1937–1991), usually credited as Farah Awl, was a Somali writer. His surname Cawl means "gazelle", which was the nickname of his great-grandfather who was the Sultan of the Warsangali clan. The Awl family also includes the Warsangali Sultan Mohamoud Ali Shire.

Biography
Awl was born in 1937 in the town of Las Khorey in North eastern Somalia. In his youth, he obtained a scholarship to study aeronautical and automobile engineering in London in the United Kingdom (1959–62). Upon graduation, he moved to Somalia and worked with the police force and the National Transport Agency in Mogadishu.

Awl's literary corpus is especially notable for its vivid description of Somalia's flora and fauna as well as its incorporation of traditional Somali poetry. He also has the distinction of being the first Somali novelist to write in the nascent Latin script for the Somali language after its formalization in 1972.

Awl was a member of the royal family of the Warsangali clan. Reportedly because of his membership in the Darod clan family, Awl, along with three of his children, was killed in 1991, at the height of the civil unrest that gripped the town of Beledweyne in the Hiiraan region.

He is survived by his wife and one son, Dahir Farah.

Bibliography
Aqoondarro waa U nacab jacayl ("Ignorance is the enemy of love"), 1982
Garbaduubkii gumeysiga ("The Shackles of Colonialism"), 1978
Dhibbanaha aan dhalan ("The Unborn Victim"), 1989
Aqoondarro waa u nacab jacayl, 1974

See also
Nuruddin Farah

References

1937 births
1992 deaths
Somalian novelists
20th-century novelists
Sanaag